Hasse is an unincorporated community located in Comanche County, in the U.S. state of Texas. According to the Handbook of Texas, the community had a population of 43 in 2000.

History
The area in what is known as Hasse today was first settled in 1892 and was originally called Cordwood Junction. Its name was changed to Hasse after O.H. Hasse, who served as a railroad agent in Comanche. A post office was established at Hasse in 1900. The community had a population of more than 100 that same year. It grew to 250 in 1915 and had more than 15 businesses, which included a bank and phone service. Its population was 248 in 1940 and had only five businesses. The population plunged to 40 in 1950. Its population was then estimated as 43 from 1980 through 2000. 

Flatcars from the railroad shipped lumber into the community. A depot was built in the community due to its high demand for fuel. Locals raised cotton and cattle and had a cotton gin, stock pens, and a lumber yard. Its decline was caused by people moving to urban areas and the arrival of automobiles and highways. Only a few buildings remain there today.

Geography

Education
Hasse's local school joined the Comanche Independent School District in 1955 and continues to be served by Comanche ISD to this day.

References

Unincorporated communities in Comanche County, Texas
Unincorporated communities in Texas